Albert F. Erhardt (1862 – 30 August 1929) was a British lawyer, judge, and colonial administrator.

Erhardt began practicing Law in 1889, before joining the colonial service in 1896 as District Commissioner of Lagos, now in Nigeria. He went on to become Resident of Ibadan, as well as Attorney-General and Treasurer of Lagos (succeeding F. C. Fuller, in 1902). In February 1903 he became Attorney-General of Fiji, serving until 1914. During this period he also filled in for Sir Charles Major, the Chief Justice of Fiji and Chief Judicial Commissioner for the Western Pacific, from 1910 to 1911, while Major was acting in an interim capacity as Governor of Fiji and High Commissioner for the Western Pacific. In his role as Attorney-General, he also served in the Executive Council and Legislative Council.

In 1914, he returned to Africa as a judge of the British East Africa Protectorate. His final post, in 1920, was as a temporary assistant legal adviser in the Colonial Office.

|-

References 

 

1862 births
1929 deaths
Alumni of the University of Oxford
Attorneys General of the Colony of Fiji
Attorneys-general of Fiji
Attorneys General of Lagos State
British expatriates in Nigeria
Chief judicial commissioners for the Western Pacific
Chief justices of Fiji
Colony of Fiji judges
East Africa Protectorate judges
Members of the Legislative Council of Fiji
Members of the Executive Council of Fiji
History of Lagos
People from colonial Nigeria